Back to the World is the second solo album by Dennis DeYoung, released in 1986 on A&M Records. The album reached No. 108 on the Billboard 200 chart. "Call Me" reached No. 5 on the Adult Contemporary chart and No. 54 on the Billboard Hot 100, while "This Is the Time" peaked at No. 93.

"This Is the Time" was included on the soundtrack to the 1986 film Karate Kid II. Meanwhile, "Call Me" was a radio hit in the Philippines, with several radio stations playing it.

Track listing
All songs written by Dennis DeYoung:

 "This Is The Time" – 3:57
 "Warning Shot" – 4:27
 "Call Me" – 4:49
 "Unanswered Prayers" – 6:37
 "Black Wall" – 5:53
 "Southbound Ryan" – 4:43
 "I'm So Lucky" – 4:43
 "Person To Person" – 4:57

Personnel
Dennis DeYoung: keyboards, lead vocals, percussion
Tom Dziallo: guitars, bass, drums on "Call Me," "Warning Shot," and "Unanswered Prayers"
C.J. Vanston: keyboards, keyboard programming
Wayne Stewart: drums
Steve Eisen: saxophone, congas, flute solo
Marc Colby: saxophone solos on "Call Me" and "Unanswered Prayers"
Tony Brown: bass on "I'll Get Lucky"
Howard Levy: harmonica
Horns
 Marc Olsen: trumpet
 Ron Friedman: trumpet
 Bruce Otto: trombone
Background Singers
 Gary Loizzo
 Tom Griffin
 Pat Hurley Rans
 Sandy Caulfield
 Tere Davenport
 Tony Ransom
 Dawn Feusi
Miscellaneous
Vince Gutman: drum programming on MX-1 and MX-MIXI
George Leemon: keyboard technician and Keeper of the Books

1986 albums
Dennis DeYoung albums
A&M Records albums